Definitely Maybe Tour was a world concert tour by English band Oasis in support of their hugely successful debut album Definitely Maybe. The tour, which spanned the UK, Europe, Japan, the US and Canada, included 143 shows over a period of several months in 1994 and 1995 amidst 10 different tour legs. The tour started on 6 February 1994 with a short concert at Gleneagles, Scotland, and ended on 22 April 1995 at the Sheffield Arena. The latter show featured an acoustic debut of the future hit "Don't Look Back in Anger", and was also the last concert to feature original drummer Tony McCarroll.

Definitely Maybe was released midway through the tour and was widely acclaimed, propelling Oasis to become one of the foremost British acts and put them squarely at the forefront of the emerging Britpop scene. The Gallagher brothers regularly made tabloid headlines for their frequent fallouts and rockstar lifestyles, and the tour had several disruptions and cancellations. One such occasion occurred when the band used drugs prior to the 29 September 1994 gig at the legendary Whisky a Go Go in California. The gig was a failure with numerous mistakes and afterwards, Noel left the band for several days. He was ultimately tracked down by the band's management and persuaded to continue the tour. Noel wrote the song "Talk Tonight" during this time while away from the band. They then headed to a recording studio and recorded new songs.

The Cliffs Pavilion gig on 17 April 1995 was filmed and later released as the Oasis VHS/DVD Live by the Sea.

Set list
The band's typical set list was:

"Rock 'N' Roll Star"
"Columbia"
"Digsy's Dinner"
"Shakermaker"
"Live Forever"
"Bring It On Down"
"Up In The Sky"
"Slide Away"
"Cigarettes & Alcohol"
"Married With Children"
"Whatever" (only during the second half of the tour, when it became a staple of their Set List)
"Supersonic"
"I Am the Walrus"

Other songs performed (Often in an acoustic set halfway through the show with Noel performing on his own):
"Talk Tonight"
"Listen Up"
"Fade Away"
"Take Me Away"
"D'yer Wanna Be A Spaceman"
"Sad Song"
"(It's Good) To Be Free"
"Headshrinker"
"I Will Believe"
"Don't Look Back In Anger" played only at the Sheffield Arena gig
"Acquiesce" played only at the Cliffs Pavilion, Sheffield Arena and final 2 Le Bataclan gigs
"Some Might Say" played only at the Cliffs Pavilion, Sheffield Arena and final 2 Le Bataclan gigs

Some people claim "Cloudburst" was played at The Water Rats in 1994, however, this can't be confirmed.

Credits:
"I Am the Walrus" written by Lennon-McCartney
All remaining tracks written by Noel Gallagher

Tour dates

References

Oasis (band) concert tours
1994 concert tours
1995 concert tours